The 52nd season of the Campeonato Gaúcho kicked off on January 16, 1972, and ended on August 6, 1972. Twenty-five teams participated. Internacional won their 20th title.

Participating teams

System 
The championship would have two stages.:

 Preliminary phase: Twenty-three clubs would be divided into four groups - one with five teams and three with six. each team played the teams in its group twice. The two best teams in each group qualified to the decagonal.
 Decagonal: The remaining eight teams, now joined by Grêmio and Internacional, would play each other in a double round-robin format. The team with the most points won the title

Championship

Preliminary phase

Group A

Group B

Group C

Group D

Decagonal

References 

Campeonato Gaúcho seasons
Gaúcho